Carlos Anaya Lopez Camelo (1777–1862) was an Uruguayan politician and historian from Buenos Aires, who served as interim President of the Republic between 1834 and 1835, in his capacity as President of the Senate.

Background
Anaya was born in San Pedro, Buenos Aires. He drafted the Uruguayan Declaration of Independence, 1825.

He was senator from 1832 to 1838. This was in the period before the party system had been fully developed in Uruguay. In October 1834 President Fructuoso Rivera stepped down from office. Anaya served as the President of the Senate of Uruguay from 1834 to 1835, and from 1837 to 1838.

Anaya was the author of some noted historical works.

President of Uruguay
Anaya served as President of Uruguay from 24 October 1834 to 1 March 1835, having succeeded Fructuoso Rivera in that office.

Anaya was himself succeeded as President by Manuel Oribe.

Death
Anaya died in Montevideo in 1862.

See also
 Politics of Uruguay

References 

Sources
 :es:Carlos Anaya

Writers from Buenos Aires
Presidents of Uruguay
Presidents of the Senate of Uruguay
Argentine emigrants to Uruguay
Uruguayan people of Spanish descent
Uruguayan people of Basque descent
Colorado Party (Uruguay) politicians
1777 births
1862 deaths
19th-century Uruguayan historians